"Here" is a popular song, with music written by Harold Grant and lyrics by Dorcas Cochran, published in 1954. (Most sources show music and lyrics by both, but Cochran was a lyricist and Grant a composer.) The melody was adapted from the operatic aria, "Caro nome," from the opera Rigoletto by Giuseppe Verdi.

A hit version was recorded by Tony Martin on December 26, 1953. This recording was released by RCA Victor Records as catalog number 20-5665. It first reached the Billboard magazine Best Seller chart on March 17, 1954 and lasted 16 weeks on the chart, peaking at #7.

The song was also recorded by The Four Belles with Larry Clinton's orchestra and by Jimmy Young at about the same time, and by Robert Goulet in 1961.

References

1954 songs
Songs with lyrics by Dorcas Cochran